Spring Grove Township may refer to these places in the United States:

Spring Grove Township, Greene County, Arkansas
Spring Grove Township, Warren County, Illinois
Spring Grove Township, Linn County, Iowa
Spring Grove Township, Houston County, Minnesota
Spring Grove Township, Harlan County, Nebraska
Spring Grove Township, McHenry County, North Dakota
Spring Grove Township, Roberts County, South Dakota

Township name disambiguation pages